Kelly's Corners station, MP 51.4 on the Ulster and Delaware Railroad, (and thus 51.4 miles from Kingston Point) served a rural farming community, which there were plenty of in Delaware County.

The station was located north of Kelly's Corners between New York State Route 30 and the railroad tracks, just opposite the cemetery.  When it was first built, it was nothing but a board-and-batten flag stop and a place for local farmers to drop off milk. It was soon replaced with a new station, which was a few hundred feet away, but the new station never made much business, and it became a flag stop again in the 1920s. In addition to the station, the railroad also maintained a section house and a coal pocket here.

Two creameries were located in Kelly's Corners: the first: "Yankee Creamery" was near the present day grade crossing of State Route 30 and the railroad right of way. Some of the field stone foundation can be located with the brush. There is documentation that the Yankee Creamery was a joint venture between Hanford S. Shultis, owner of "Elgin of the Catskills" dairy farm, and E. Louis Kadans, owner of Kadan's Creamery in Dunraven, New York.

The other creamery, the "Eureka Creamery" was located on the opposite side of the valley from the station (present day 'Frog Alley').  Eureka Creamery moved milk cans back and forth from the U&D using a push cart which ran on tracks set on a trestle running from the station, across the river and into the creamery. By the 1950s the station had been moved across the highway and sat in front of the cemetery. When New York State rebuilt Route 30 in the 1960s they razed the station along with several other houses and barns in the area. One of the original station signs for Kelly Corners is displayed in the Arkville station of the Delaware & Ulster Railroad.

References

External links
 Delaware & Ulster Railride
 Ulster & Delaware Railroad Historical Society
 Online Guide to the Catskill Mountains 
 The Catskill Archive - history of the Catskill Mtns.
 Memorabilia of Northern Catskill Mountain Railroads

Railway stations in the Catskill Mountains
Railway stations in Delaware County, New York
Former Ulster and Delaware Railroad stations
Former railway stations in New York (state)
Railway stations closed in 1954